Ligaya Ang Itawag Mo Sa Akin (International Title: They Call Me Joy) is a 1997 Philippine film directed by Carlos Siguion-Reyna. The film stars Rosanna Roces as the title role. It is one of the blockbuster hit movies produced by Reyna Films.

Synopsis
Ligaya (Roces) is a veteran prostitute whose name means "joy", and is ironically tired and unhappy with her lifestyle. Having saved enough money, she decides to leave whoring for good, but love unexpectedly comes her way in the form of a sincere and honest farmer called Poldíng (Arcilla). The farmer, who falls madly in love with her, is Ligaya's ticket to a decent, respectable life.

Roces' oft-quoted line from the film is "Ligaya ang itawag mo sa akin, 'yan ang trabaho ko, nagbibigáy-ligaya." ("Call me 'Joy,' that's my job, giving joy"). It is often used in a humorous context, where the speaker parodies the catty attitude of a prostitute advertising her ability to give "pleasure".

Cast
 Rosanna Roces as Ligaya
 John Arcilla as Polding
 Isabel Granada as Estela
 Chanda Romero as Lolay
 Armida Siguion-Reyna as Ima
 Pen Medina as Tikyo
 Eva Darren as Gunda
 Ihman Esturco as Mayor
 Crispin Pineda as Padre Teofilo
 Myrna Castillo as Susan
 Macky Villalon as Agnes
 Rubirosa as Estela's Aunt
 Marie De Castro as Jenny
 Sammy Macairan as Abnoy

Awards

References

See also

1997 films
1990s Tagalog-language films
Philippine drama films
Star Cinema films
Films directed by Carlos Siguion-Reyna
1997 drama films